The Arkansas Policy Foundation (APF) is a conservative think tank based in Little Rock, Arkansas. According to APF, the organization "emphasizes the importance of tax policy and education reform."

Activities
From 1996-1999, APF crafted a detailed review of state government known as the Murphy Commission report. The organization has issued recommendations on education reform, ethics reform, and health care. It has proposed tax and spending cuts, including a reduction in sales taxes applied to groceries. In December 2015, Arkansas Governor Asa Hutchinson requested that APF conduct another efficiency review in order to take a statewide look at governmental efficiency.

See also
Advance Arkansas Institute

References

External links
Arkansas Policy Foundation
 Organizational Profile – National Center for Charitable Statistics (Urban Institute)

1995 establishments in Arkansas
Conservative organizations in the United States
Non-profit organizations based in Little Rock, Arkansas
Think tanks based in the United States
Think tanks established in 1995